Lake Toxaway is an unincorporated community in western Transylvania County, North Carolina on U.S. Route 64, and North Carolina Highway 281.

National Register of Historic Places 
The E. M. Backus Lodge, known as Canaan Land, was listed on the National Register of Historic Places in 1988.

References 

Populated places in Transylvania County, North Carolina